This article lists the rulers of Tyrone (Irish: Tír Eoghain) from 1185 to 1616. They are listed from their date of accession to date of death, unless otherwise stated.

Prior to this, the ruling dynasty - the Cenél nEógain - were most of the kings of Ailech. During the tenth and eleventh centuries, two main septs within the dynasty emerged; the Meic Lochlainn and the O'Neill. The latter family pushed aside the Meic Lochlainn, and from 1241 onwards the kingdom was ruled exclusively by members of the O'Neill family.

For the offshoot Clandeboye O'Neill kingdom, distinct from Tyrone, that was ruled by the descendants of Hugh Boy O'Neill, see List of rulers of Clandeboye.

Kings of Tyrone, 1185—1607

|-
| Domhnall mac Aodha Mac Lochlainn 1185–11861187–1188 || || Son of Aodh Mac Lochlainn||unknown||  1188
|-
| Ruaidhrí Ó Flaithbheartaigh 1186–1187 ||  || Son of Aodh Ó Flaithbheartaigh||	unknown||  1197
|-
| Muirchertaigh Mac Lochlainn 1188–1196 || || Son of Muirchertach Mac Lochlainn||unknown||  1196
|-
| Aodh Méith mac Aodha O'Neill 1196–12011201–1230 ||  || Son of Aodh an Macaoimh Tóinleasg O'Neill||	Bean-Midhe||  1230
|-
| Conchobhar Beg mac Conchobhair Mac Lochlainn 1201 || || Son of Conchobar mac Muirchertaigh Mac Lochlainn son of Muirchertach Mac Lochlainn||unknown||  1201
|-
| Niall Ruadh mac Aodha O'Neill 1230 ||  || Son of Aodh an Macaoimh Tóinleasg O'Neill||Nuala O'Connor||  1235
|-
| Domhnall mac Muirchertaigh Mac Lochlainn 1230–12321235–12381239–1241 || || Son of Muirchertach Mac Muirchertaigh Mac Lochlainn son of Muirchertach Mac Lochlainn||unknown||  1241
|-
| Domhnall Óg mac Aodha Méith O'Neill 1232–1235 ||  || Son of Aodh Méith mac Aodha O'Neill||unknown||  1235
|-
| Brian Chatha an Dúna O'Neill 1238–12391241–1260 ||  || Son of Niall Ruadh mac Aodha O'Neill and Nuala O'Connor||unknown||  16 May 1260
|-
| Hugh Boy O'Neill 1260–12611263–1283 ||  || Son of Domhnall Óg mac Aodha Méith O'Neill ||unknown|| 1283
|-
| Niall Culanach O'Neill 1261–12631286–1290 ||  || Son of Domhnall Óg mac Aodha Méith O'Neill ||unknown|| 1290
|-
| Domhnall O'Neill 1283–12861290–12911295–1325 ||  || Son of Brian O'Neill ||Gormhflaith O'Donnell|| 1325
|-
| Brian O'Neill 1291–1295 ||  || Son of Hugh Boy O'Neill and Eleanor de Angulo ||unknown|| 1295
|-
| Henry O'Neill 1325–1345 ||  || Son of Brian O'Neill||unknown|| 1347
|-
| Aodh Reamhair O'Neill 1345–1364 ||  || Son of Domhnall O'Neill and Gormflaith O'Donnell||unknown|| 1364
|-
| Niall Mór mac Aodha Reamhair O'Neill 1364–1397 ||  || Son of Aodh Reamhair O'Neill||unknown|| 1398
|-
| Niall Óg mac Néill O'Neill 1397–1402 ||  || Son of Niall Mór mac Aodha Reamhair O'Neill ||Una O'Neil|| 1403
|-
| Brian Óg mac Néill Óg O'Neill 1402–1403 ||  || Son of Niall Óg mac Néill O'Neill and Una O'Neill||unknown|| 1403
|-
| Domhnall mac Éinri Aimhreidh O'Neill 1404–14101414–14191421–1432 ||  || Son of Éinri Aimhreidh O'Neill son of Niall Mór O'Neill||unknown || 1410
|-
| Eoghan mac Néill Óg O'Neill 1410–14141419–14211432–1455 ||  || Son of Niall Óg mac Néill O'Neill and Una O'Neill||Catherine MacMahon || 1456
|-
| Éinri mac Eoghain O'Neill 1455–1483 ||  || Son of Eoghan mac Néill Óg O'Neill||Gormhflaith MacMurrough-Kavanagh || 1484
|-
| Conn Mór mac Éinri O'Neill 1483–1493 ||  || Son of Éinri mac Eoghain O'Neill and Gormhflaith MacMurrough-Kavanagh||Cumach O'CahanEleanor FitzGerald || 8 January 1493
|-
| Éinri Óg mac Éinri O'Neill 1493–1498 ||  || Son of Éinri mac Eoghain O'Neill and Gormhflaith MacMurrough-Kavanagh|| unknown || 21 August 1498
|-
| Domhnall Clarach O'Neill 1498–1509 ||  || Son of Éinri mac Eoghain O'Neill and Gormhflaith MacMurrough-Kavanagh||unknown || 6 August 1509
|-
| Art mac Aodh O'Neill 1509–1513 ||  || Son of Aodh O'Neill of the Fews son of Eoghan mac Néill Óg O'Neill||unknown || 1513
|-
| Art Oge O'Neill 1513–1519 ||  || 1470Son of Conn Mór mac Éinri O'Neill and Cumach O'Cahan||unknown || 1519
|-
| Conn Bacagh O'Neill 1519–1558 ||  || 1484Son of Conn Mór mac Éinri O'Neill and Eleanor FitzGerald ||Alice FitzGeraldSorcha O'Neill || 16 July 1559
|-
| Shane O'Neill 1559–1567 ||  || 1530 Son of Conn O'Neill, 1st Earl of Tyrone and Alice FitzGerald ||Catherine McDonnellMargaret O'DonnellCatherine MacLean || 2 June 1567Cushendun
|-
| Turlough Luineach O'Neill 1567–1593 ||  || 1532 Son of Niall Connellagh O'Neill son of Art Oge O'Neill ||Agnes Campbell|| 10 September 1595
|-
| Hugh O'Neill 1593–1607 ||  || 1550Son of Matthew O'Neill, 1st Baron Dungannon and Alison Roth (legitimised son of Conn O'Neill, 1st Earl of Tyrone) ||Katherine O'NeillSiobhán O'DonnellMabel BagenalKatherine Magennis || 20 July 1616Rome
|-
|}
It could also be argued that Conn Bacach had taken the title Earl of Tyrone in 1542, as part of the process of surrender and regrant, and in the process had waived his title. Whether he could waive it without consulting   his clan derbfine is part of this debate.

Conn Bacach's grandson Hugh was not proclaimed king at Tullyhogue in 1593, but assumed the title after arranging to pay Turlough Luineach an annuity.

See also
 List of High Kings of Ireland
 List of kings of Clandeboye
 List of kings of Tyrconnell
 List of kings of Ailech
 List of kings of Airgíalla
 List of kings of Dál nAraidi
 List of kings of Ulster
 List of kings of Dál Riata

References

Bibliography
 "Kings of Tír Eógain and Earls of Tyrone, 1185-1616", pages 211-213, "A New History of Ireland", Volume 9: Maps, Genealogies, Lists; A Companion to Irish History Part II", edited by T. W. Moody, F.X. Martin, F.J. Byrne, Oxford, 1984.

Tyrone
Meic Lochlainn
O'Neill dynasty